J. Francisco Guzmán Carmigniani (born 24 May 1946), known as Pancho Guzmán, is an Ecuadorian former tennis player active in the 1960s and 1970s.

Biography
Guzmán, the son of a banker, began playing tennis at the age of seven and trained at the Guayaquil Tennis Club. He was 11 when he won his first national title and in 1961 was a finalist in the Orange Bowl. In 1963 he made his Davis Cup debut for Ecuador, for a tie against Trinidad and Tobago, aged only 17.

In the 1965 French Championships, Guzmán was in the unusual situation of exiting  in the third round, without even playing a match. He received a first round bye, then benefited from a walkover in the second round when number one seed Manuel Santana had to withdraw. In the third round he lost in a walkover to Bill Hoogs. He made the third round again at the 1966 French Championships, but this time featured in the tournament, with wins over Mike Belkin and Terry Ryan. In the mixed doubles he partnered with Helen Gourlay to make the semi-finals. Curiously he is listed as losing in a walkover for the first round of the singles in every French Open from 1967 to 1971.

His most famous moment came in the 1967 Davis Cup when he defeated Arthur Ashe in the reverse singles to complete a surprise victory for Ecuador over the United States in the Americas Inter-Zonal Final. The tie was played on Guzmán's home court in Guayaquil. He began started with a loss to Cliff Richey in the first match of the tie, before Miguel Olvera levelled it at 1–1 going into the doubles. Guzmán then teamed up with Olvera to win the doubles rubber, 8–6 in the fifth set. Guzmán secured the tie in the first of the reverse singles in a match against Ashe which went the distance. He lost two of the sets 0–6, including the first, but was able to prevail in five. Ecuador widely celebrated the win across the country and the El Universo newspaper used a headline that translates to "A victory for history" to describe to triumph. This qualified Ecuador for Inter-Zonal semi final against Spain in Barcelona and where they were no match for the European team who eliminated them from the tournament.

He came from two sets down to beat Bob Lutz in a 64-game marathon opening round match at the 1968 Wimbledon Championships. Later in the year he competed in the exhibition tournament for tennis at the 1968 Summer Olympics and won a bronze medal in men's doubles with Teimuraz Kakulia.

At the 1969 Canadian Open he made it as far as the quarter-finals of the singles, where he was two points away from upsetting top seed John Newcombe in the fifth set, as well as making the semi-finals in the doubles, with Dick Crealy.

In 1974 he made his last Davis Cup appearance for Ecuador. He featured with a total of 14 ties and finished his representative career with 13 wins from 37 matches.

See also
List of Ecuador Davis Cup team representatives

References

External links
 
 
 

1946 births
Living people
Ecuadorian male tennis players
Sportspeople from Guayaquil
Tennis players at the 1968 Summer Olympics
Pan American Games medalists in tennis
Pan American Games bronze medalists for Ecuador
Tennis players at the 1967 Pan American Games
20th-century Ecuadorian people